The Möll (presumably from , "rubble") is a river in northwestern Carinthia in Austria, a left tributary of the Drava.

Course
The river rises in the High Tauern range of the Central Eastern Alps on the Pasterze Glacier at the foot of the Grossglockner, the highest mountain in Austria. It discharges after  near Möllbrücke into the Drava. At the beginning of its course, at the southeastern end of the Pasterze Glacier, it is impounded to form the Margaritze Reservoir, from where part of the water is diverted via pressure tunnels across the Alpine crest and Mt. Wiesbachhorn to the reservoirs of the Verbund hydroelectric power plant in Kaprun, Salzburg.

The Möll then runs down to Heiligenblut, parallel to the Grossglockner High Alpine Road, and further southwards separating the mountains of the Schober Group in the west from the Goldberg Group in the east. In the municipality of Winklern, near the border with Tyrol (East Tyrol) at Iselsberg Pass, it turns eastwards running through the broad lower part of the Möll Valley along the northern rim of the Kreuzeck Group.

Downstream near Stall the Möll waters are again impounded into the Gößnitz Reservoir. At Obervellach the river course is joined by the parallel Tauern Railway line descending from Mallnitz and the southern Tauern Tunnel portal. Near Kolbnitz and its confluence with the Drava the Möll is once again dammed up to create the Rottau equalizing basin. From here some of the water is diverted to the lower stage of the Malta-Reisseck Power Plant in Möllbrücke.

The Möll is a popular kayak white water river and one of the preferred rafting rivers in Carinthia.

Gallery

References

External links 

Hydrographic service in Carinthia - online survey data

Rivers of Carinthia (state)
Rivers of Austria